Giancarlo Morresi (18 September 1944 – 30 July 2019) was an Italian modern pentathlete. He finished 24th individually and ninth with the team at the 1968 Summer Olympics.

References

External links
 

1944 births
2019 deaths
Italian male modern pentathletes
Olympic modern pentathletes of Italy
Modern pentathletes at the 1968 Summer Olympics
Sportspeople from Rome
20th-century Italian people